Now is the third studio album by American R&B singer Maxwell. It was released on August 14, 2001, by Columbia Records. Following the lukewarm critical reception of his 1998 record Embrya, Maxwell pursued a different direction while recording Now, abandoning the conceptual style of his previous albums.

Now received positive reviews and became Maxwell's first album to reach number one on the Billboard 200, selling over 296,000 units in the U.S. in the first week, according to Nielsen SoundScan, and was later certified platinum by the Recording Industry Association of America (RIAA). The album's third single "This Woman's Work", a live staple of Maxwell's, charted at number 58 on the Hot 100 and at number 16 on the Hot R&B/Hip-Hop Songs chart. Now was Maxwell's last album before an eight-year hiatus, which culminated in the release of his fourth studio album BLACKsummers'night (2009).

Critical reception 

Now  received generally positive reviews from critics. At Metacritic, which assigns a normalized rating out of 100 to reviews from mainstream publications, the album received an average score of 78, based on 11 reviews. In Entertainment Weekly, Tom Sinclair found Maxwell's New Age spiritual musings to be outside the R&B mainstream and said "as mellowed-out as much of Now is, it's definitely not aural wallpaper, but a cohesive effort that rewards repeated listenings". Boston Herald critic Sarah Rodman said Maxwell had made the "truly terrific" Prince album the artist himself was no longer making while continuing to "distinguish himself from the current glut of overwrought and under- erotic r & b lotharios with his retro, almost absurdly soulful ways". Daryl Easlea from BBC Music highlighted the cover of the 1989 Kate Bush song "This Woman's Work" and deemed the album "grown-up, frequently gorgeous music that epitomises the very best in neo-soul". Greg Kot from the Chicago Tribune found Maxwell's lyrics far more straightforward than Embryas "almost impenetrable" songs, while applauding his ability as a singer to achieve an "enlightened empathy" that "neither panders nor demands" to his fictitious lovers. James Hunter wrote in The Village Voice that Maxwell and Stuart Matthewman had avoided the gratuitous productions of Embrya in favor of more grounded music, against which the singer performed masterfully. "He is, as throughout Now, a soul singer who knows precisely what he's doing", Hunter wrote. Fellow Village Voice critic Robert Christgau gave Now an "honorable mention" in his review column, singling out "Temporary Nite", "This Woman's Work", and "Lifetime" as its best songs, while writing that Maxwell "can't outbeat D'Angelo, so he works on outsinging and outsonging him".

In a less enthusiastic review for PopMatters, Mark Anthony Neal said Now was one of 2001's "most accomplished R&B recordings", but qualified his praise by finding some of the music unadventurous and not indicative of the artistic maturity Maxwell seemed to show on Embrya. Miles Marshall Lewis was more critical in LA Weekly, believing the singer was "not Prince" and had regressed musically with Now, throughout which "the quiet storm of Maxwell's signature sound becomes damn near somnolent". Teresa Wiltz of The Washington Post said the record predictably followed his previous albums' formula of "moody musings" on romance and heartbreak, funky musical backdrops, and pleading vocals; Wiltz lamented Maxwell's inability to "stretch beyond his self-imposed limits" on record, as she believed he had "to spectacular effect" at his concerts.

Track listing

On physical copies, "Get to Know Ya" is separated into two tracks: the first four seconds on track 1, followed by the rest of the song on track 2. The album packaging simply lists the song as track 1, with "Lifetime" as track 3. On digital copies, "Get to Know Ya" is one track, as listed above.

Personnel 
Adapted from AllMusic.

 David A. Belgrave – marketing
 Mitchell Cohen – A&R
 Maxwell – drum programming, horn arrangements, producer (credited as "musze")
 Michael Bland – drums
 David Blumberg – harp arrangement, string arrangements
 Bruce Bouton – pedal steel
 Steve Conover – assistant engineer
 Tom Coyne – mastering
 Hod David  – bass, drum programming, guitar, keyboards
 Andy Davies – engineer
 Bill Esses  – engineer
 Paul J. Falcone – drum programming, engineer, Pro-Tools
 Mark Fellows – editing
 Clark Gayton – trombone
 Drew Griffiths – engineer
 Jason Groucott – assistant engineer
 Bashiri Johnson – percussion
 Eric Johnson – photography
 Tony Maserati – engineer
 Steve Mazur – engineer
 Daniel Milazzo – assistant engineer
 Michael Neal – bass
 John O'Mahoney – assistant engineer
 Flip Osman – assistant engineer
 Matt Owens – art direction
 Mike Pela – engineer, pro-Tools
 Federico Pena – keyboards
 Larry Phillabaum – engineer, pro-Tools
 Chris Ribando – engineer
 Andre Roberson – horn arrangements, saxophone
 Iain Roberton – engineer
 Tom Schick – engineer
 Etienne Stadwijk – keyboards
 Wah Wah Watson – guitar

Chart positions

Weekly charts

Year-end charts

Certifications

References

External links 
 Now at Discogs

2001 albums
Maxwell (musician) albums
Columbia Records albums